The Samal Island–Davao City (SIDC) Connector, commonly known as the Davao–Samal Bridge, is a proposed bridge that will cross Pakiputan Strait to connect Davao City and Samal, Davao del Norte in the Philippines. On January 14, 2021, the Philippine and Chinese governments signed a contract for the design and construction of the bridge which costs 19.32 billion pesos. On October 27, 2022, President Ferdinand Marcos Jr. led the groundbreaking ceremony for the construction of the bridge.

Background
The 3.98-kilometer bridge, a flagship project under the “Build, Build, Build” program during the administration of former President Rodrigo Duterte, will be hugely funded through a loan agreement with the Chinese government.

The bridge project will connect the Samal Circumferential Road in Caliclic, Samal to the R. Castillo–Daang Maharlika junction in Buhangin, Davao City across the Pakiputan Strait. The bridge, which is 3.98 kilometers long, will be constructed within five years and is set to be completed and operational in 2027. Once completed, it is expected to reduce travel time from Davao City to Samal from around 30 minutes via ferry to only five minutes. The construction of the bridge will be funded through a loan agreement worth US$350 million or ₱18.67 billion entered into between the Philippines and China, covering 90 percent of the project cost.

References

Proposed bridges in the Philippines